Prince of Diamonds is a 1930 American pre-Code adventure film directed by Karl Brown and A. H. Van Buren and written by Paul Hervey Fox. The film stars Aileen Pringle, Ian Keith, Fritzi Ridgeway, Tyrell Davis, Claude King and Tom Ricketts. The film was released on March 26, 1930, by Columbia Pictures.

Cast           
Aileen Pringle as Eve Marley
Ian Keith as Rupert Endon
Fritzi Ridgeway as Lolah
Tyrell Davis as Lord Adrian
Claude King as Gilbert Crayle
Tom Ricketts as Williams
E. Alyn Warren as Li Fang
Gilbert Emery as Smith
Frederick Sullivan as Ormsley Hatchett
Sybil Grove as Miss Wren
G.L. McDonnell as Betterton 
Joyzelle Joyner as Dancing Girl

References

External links
 

1930 films
American adventure films
1930 adventure films
Columbia Pictures films
Films directed by Karl Brown
American black-and-white films
1930s English-language films
1930s American films